Air transports for heads of state and government are, in many countries, provided by the air force in specially equipped airliners or business jets. One such aircraft in particular has become part of popular culture: Air Force One, used by the President of the United States and operated by the United States Air Force. Other well known official aircraft include the Russian presidential aircraft, the British Royal Air Force VIP aircraft, the French Cotam 001, the Royal Canadian Air Force VIP aircraft, the German Konrad Adenauer, the Royal Australian Airforce VIP aircraft, the Japanese Air Force One, the South Korean Code One, Air India One, the Brazilian Air Force One, and the Israeli Wing of Zion.

Another well-known means of transportation for world leaders is by helicopter. Helicopters are seen as not only cheaper and more cost effective but also more convenient than a motorcade. These include the US President's Marine One, the South Korean Presidential Helicopter, King Charles III's Helicopter, and the Brazilian Presidential Helicopter.

If officials do not have their own aircraft or if their VIP aircraft are under maintenance, they would occasionally hire private jets, in which case a flag/coat of arms decal/sticker is often added on or near the door.

History 

On 15 July 1910, the then Tsar of Bulgaria Ferdinand I became the first head of state to fly in an aircraft during a visit to Belgium.

In 1919, during Paris Peace Conference, senior British politicians including Prime Minister David Lloyd George and Leader of the House of Commons Bonar Law used several Airco DH.4 planes for the cross-Channel trips. Originally designed as bombers, modified planes featured an enclosed compartment for two passengers (cockpit was left open) and a separate luggage compartment. Dubbed Lloyd George's airplane, it was probably one of the first aircraft to be widely used by a political leader.

The British Monarch became the first head of state or government to receive official and dedicated air transport when two Westland Wapitis were delivered to No. 24 Squadron RAF at RAF Northolt for the express purpose of the transportation of the Royal Family in 1928. Between 1929 and 1935, Edward, Prince of Wales, purchased 13 aircraft. Although the RAF maintained at least one of these aircraft for a time, the Prince of Wales eventually became solely responsible for them. When the prince ascended to the throne in 1936 as Edward VIII, The King's Flight was formed as the world's first head of state aircraft unit. This unit initially used the King's own de Havilland DH.89 Dragon Rapide; however, this was replaced in May 1937 by an Airspeed AS.6J Envoy III.

In the United States, prior to World War II, overseas and cross-country presidential travel was rare. Franklin D. Roosevelt was the first president to fly in an aircraft while in office. During World War II, Roosevelt traveled on the Dixie Clipper, a Pan Am-crewed Boeing 314 flying boat, to the 1943 Casablanca Conference in Morocco. The flight covered 5,500 miles in three legs. The first dedicated aircraft proposed for presidential use was a Consolidated C-87 Liberator Express VIP transport aircraft. This aircraft, tail number 41-24159, was re-modified in 1943 for use as a presidential VIP transport, the Guess Where II, intended to carry President Franklin D. Roosevelt on international trips. The Secret Service subsequently reconfigured a Douglas C-54 Skymaster for duty as a presidential transport. This VC-54C aircraft, nicknamed the Sacred Cow, included a sleeping area, radio telephone, and retractable elevator to lift Roosevelt in his wheelchair. As modified, the VC-54C was used by President Roosevelt only once, on his trip to and from the Yalta Conference in February 1945.

In the postwar period, governments around the world have instituted similar provisions for the official aerial transportation of their heads of state and government.

List of aircraft, by country

Afghanistan

The government of Afghanistan has no official plane for travel purposes, though officials usually travel on national airlines, such as Ariana Afghan Airlines or Kam Air. Occasionally, officials would travel on hired Azerbaijani aircraft, since Afghanistan and Azerbaijan have good diplomatic relations.

In January 2022, months after the Taliban insurgency reclaimed power in Afghanistan, representatives of the new Afghan regime attended a series of meetings in Norway; the first official visit by a delegation from the group to Europe since taking power. They flew to Norway in a Falcon 7X corporate jet operated by Finnish operator Jetflite, a trip which was reportedly paid for by the Norwegian government.

Albania
In January 2020, the Turkish government leased an Airbus A319 (TC-ANA) to the Albanian government for their use. Although Albanian titles have been placed over the previous Turkish government livery, the aircraft retains its Turkish registration. The livery bears striking resemblance to that of Air Albania. Before the acquisition, the Albanian government hired private jets or flew on commercial airlines. The aircraft flies under the callsign "TRK8".

Algeria 

The government of Algeria operates an Airbus A340-500. They also can use a number of 4 Gulfstream Aerospace G-IV, 1 Gulfstream Aerospace G-V and 2 ATR-72-600. Upon their request, officials can also occasionally travel on rented Air Algerie aircraft. The governmental planes use their registrations as callsigns, albeit without the hyphen.

Andorra 
The government does not have any presidential aircraft, and the country doesn't have an airport other than a small one near its border, but they once flew to a summit on a Spanish Air Force Boeing 707.

Angola 
The government of Angola operates two Bombardier Global Express (reg:D2-ANG, D2-ANH), two De Havilland Canada Dash 8-Q402 and Dassault Falcon 900 (reg:D2-ANT).

Before, a Boeing 707 was used for VIP transport. Officials occasionally also tend to hire private jets from companies such as DeerJet, Aviation Link or Royal Jet. Most of these aircraft, when used by the President, fly under the callsign "ANGOLA1".

Antigua and Barbuda 
The Prime Minister and the Government of Antigua and Barbuda flies on commercial aircraft or the Britten-Norman BN-2 Islander (reg:ABDF-A1) operated by the Antigua and Barbuda Defence Force Air Wing.

Argentina 

The president of Argentina flies in a government-owned Airbus A330-200 registered LV-FVH, flying under the callsign "PRESI01".

Argentina operated a fleet of aircraft and helicopters for exclusive use by President of Argentina and his or her family. This set of aircraft was known as the Agrupación Aérea Presidencial (Spanish for Presidential Air Group) and belonged to one of the Departments of the Presidency, called the Military House ( Casa Militar). This was responsible for the presidential security and transportation. Incorporated during presidency of Carlos Menem to replace a Boeing 707, Boeing 757 T-01 was used for international visits. The Agrupación Aérea Presidencial was closed in 2016 by then-president Mauricio Macri, because of the high cost of repairs and maintenance and the lack of adequate pilots and spare parts. The fleet of the Presidential Air Group in 2014 was:

 T-01 (Tango 01) Boeing 757-200
 T-02 Fokker F-28-4000 Fellowship
 T-03 Fokker F-28-1000C Fellowship
 T-04 Boeing 737-500
 T-10 Learjet 60
 H-01 Sikorsky S-70A Black Hawk
 H-02 Sikorsky S-76B
 H-03 Sikorsky S-76B

All aircraft from the Agrupación Aérea Presidencial are currently stored, however Mauricio Macri used the Boeing 737-500 for domestic and short-haul trips.

It was revealed, after Macri stepped down, that a Boeing 737-700 was commissioned by President Alberto Fernandez for international travel. The plane would carry the registration T-99. Prior to this announcement, the 737 used to operate under Ethiopian Airlines and SAS Scandinavian.

In 2014, Argentinian officials Axel Kicillof and Hector Timmerman traveled to the G20 in Brisbane, however, due to maintenance a private Swiss-registered Dassault Falcon 7X was leased and used. The plane flew from Rio Gallegos to Christchurch for a stopover before flying to Brisbane.

Armenia 

The Armenian Government operates an Airbus A319. They previously operated a Tupolev Tu-134. The A319 usually flies under the callsign "ARY4---", meaning any four-digit number beginning with 4.

Australia 

The Royal Australian Air Force operates a number of specialised aircraft to carry the King of Australia, members of the Royal Family, the Governor General of Australia, the Prime Minister of Australia, senior members of the Australian government, and other dignitaries.

The RAAF's current Special Purpose Aircraft are two leased Boeing Business Jets and three Dassault Falcon 7Xs which are operated by No. 34 Squadron RAAF and are based at Canberra Airport. The Falcon 7Xs replaced three Bombardier Challenger 604s in 2019. The Boeing Business Jets are custom configured Boeing 737-700s fitted with facilities such as conference tables, offices suites, secure satellite and communication capabilities. The two aircraft have a longer range than is standard for Boeing Business Jets. The Prime Minister regularly makes use of the aircraft for domestic and international travel.

The BBJs and Challenger 604s replaced five No. 34 Squadron Dassault Falcon 900s and passenger-configured Boeing 707s tanker transports of No. 33 Squadron RAAF in 2002. These in turn replaced two BAC One-Elevens, three Dassault Falcon 20s and two Hawker Siddeley HS 748s.

In August 2014, Defence Minister David Johnston announced the intention to convert an Airbus A330 MRTT multi-role tanker to VIP configuration whilst maintaining its ability to serve as a military tanker and transport aircraft.[1] The new aircraft has tail number A39-007 and is painted in "air force grey" rather than the white colour scheme. While no official photos have been released, the aircraft has 100 lie-flat seats for its passengers. Beechcraft King Air 350 turboprop light transport aircraft of No. 32 Squadron RAAF may also be tasked.

Current Royal Australian Air Force VIP aircraft:
 Airbus A330 MRTT (1 aircraft, 2019–present)
 737 Boeing Business Jet (2 aircraft, 2002–current)
 Dassault Falcon 7X (3 aircraft, 2019–present)

These aircraft usually fly under the callsign "ASY", followed by a three-digit number.

Austria 
The government of Austria has never operated VIP transport aircraft, although there were plans in the late 1980s to acquire a BAe 146-100STA, capable of being converted into a VIP configuration - however, the already painted and registered aircraft was never flown to Austria, as the deal had to be cancelled due to political pressure that led to tensions within the Austrian Government. The head of state, as well as members of the government, are flown on scheduled flights, preferably using flag carrier Austrian Airlines, occasionally chartering smaller aircraft. Until the late 1990s, domestic VIP flights were operated by a four-seater Saab 105OE of the Austrian Air Force. For visits of peacekeeping missions of the Austrian Armed Forces, a Lockheed C-130K Hercules is still being used.

Azerbaijan 
The President of Azerbaijan has three aircraft dedicated for his use: an Airbus A319 "Baku" (reg:4K-8888) owned directly by the government, Airbus A320 Prestige (reg:4K-AI07), Boeing 767-300ER "Baku-1" (reg:4K-AI01) owned directly by the government, and a leased Airbus A340-600 "Baku-8" (reg:4K-AI08). All three aircraft are equipped with jamming equipment, anti-missile systems, and midair refueling equipment. Other aircraft operated by the government are a number of Gulfstreams (reg:4K-AZ888, 4K-AI06, 4K-AI88), and a now-retired Tupolev Tu-154. A Boeing 777-200 (reg:4K-AI001) has been ordered by the government to serve as the new state travel aircraft.

The A340 usually flies under the callsign "AHY6731"/2", the 767 under the callsign "AHY6734", the A319 under the callsign "AH6735"/6", the A320 under the callsign "AHY6737"/8", and the Gulfstreams use their registrations without the hyphen as callsigns.

The Bahamas 
The government travels on turbo-prop and commercial aircraft.

Bahrain 

The Bahrain Royal Flight and Bahrain Defense Force use 2 Boeing 747-400, 1 Boeing 767-400, 1 Boeing 737-800, 5 BAe-146 of various modifications and 3 Gulfstream Aerospace (G450, G550, G650) for VIP transportation.

In terms of callsigns, the 747-400s flies under "BAH1"/2", the 767-400 flies under "BAH3", the Gulfstream G450 under "BAH4", the Gulfstream G650 under "BAH6", and the Avro RJ85 under "BAH8".

Bangladesh 

The President and the Prime Minister of Bangladesh travel on specially reserved aircraft of the country's national flag carrier Biman Bangladesh Airlines. Until Bangladesh Biman bought Boeing 787 S2-AJY is mostly used for her and other government transport purposes, for long-distance flights or flights with an especially large entourage, usually a Boeing 777-300ER aircraft is used, whereas for medium to short-distance flights Boeing 787 Dreamliner In many cases, two Biman aircraft are reserved for government flights, one as a standby aircraft. As of Today, Boeing 787 S2-AJY is mostly used for this purpose. This plane is also her favourite plane.

The Bangladesh Air Force has a VVIP fleet of four helicopters, two Mil Mi-17s and two Bell 212s. One is always reserved for VVIP flights. The other three are for carrying the staff and entourage.

Barbados 
The government travels on turbo-prop and commercial aircraft.

Belarus 

The airline Belavia operates a Boeing 767-300ER, a Boeing BBJ and a Bombardier Challenger 850 on behalf of the government for use of the President and Prime Minister.

Also recently, a new Gulfstream Aerospace G550 aircraft (reg: EW-001PJ) was seen in the use of the President and his entourage.

Belgium 

For the transport of the royal family and the members of the Government, Belgium utilises one Dassault Falcon 900 and two Dassault Falcon 7X operated by the 15th Air Transport Wing of the Armed Forces. They previously operated an Airbus A321 and an Airbus A330.

Belize 
The government travels on turbo-prop and commercial aircraft.

Benin 
The Government of Benin operated a now-dismantled Boeing 727 in 2015. They also operated a now-retired Boeing 707. They now fly on private jets, preferably 737s.

Bhutan 
The King and the Government of Bhutan use an Airbus A319 from the national flag carrier Druk Air for all travel.

Bolivia 

The Bolivian Air Force operates a Rockwell Sabreliner business-jet, acquired in 1975 for use by the president and government officials. In July 2010, the Bolivian government bought a Dassault Falcon 900EX for use by the president. In July 2013, the Bolivian government acquired a Dassault Falcon 50EX for use by the Executive Body.

 1 x Falcon 900EX EASy used as Presidential Aircraft.
 1 x Dassault Falcon 50EX used by the executive branch.

Bosnia and Herzegovina 
Council of Ministers of Bosnia and Herzegovina operated a Cessna Citation I, Cessna CitationJet and Cessna Citation CJ4 (reg:E7-GPS).

Botswana 
The Botswana Defence Force operated a Bombardier Global Express in 2015. It previously operated a Gulfstream IV.

Brazil 

The main Presidential aircraft used by the Brazilian Government is a modified Airbus A319, designated by the Brazilian Air Force as VC-1A and officially christened as the "Santos-Dumont", after the Brazilian aviation pioneer. The VC-1A is used for transporting the President on international medium-range travel, and for long-range the government use a Boeing 767 leased from 2017 to 2025. For short-range flights the President is transported in one of the two modified Embraer 190 presidential jets. When an aircraft is transporting the President of Brazil it uses the callsign Força Aérea 01 (Air Force One), ICAO code BRS01.

The Special Transport Group (GTE) of the Brazilian Air Force is responsible for transporting the President, the vice-president and senior ministers of the Brazilian Government. The GTE comprises 22 aircraft:
 A modified VIP-configured Airbus A319 (VC-1A) "Santos-Dumont" used on all international flights carrying the President.
 Two modified VIP-configured Embraer 190 jets, "Bartolomeu de Gusmão" and "Augusto Severo", used on domestic and regional flights carrying the President.
 Two VIP-configured Eurocopter Super Puma (VH-34) presidential helicopters.
 Two VIP-configured Embraer ERJ-135 (VC-99C) aircraft.
 Ten Embraer ERJ-145 (C-99A) aircraft.
 Three Gates Learjet 35 (VU-35) jets.

The fleet is headquartered at the Brasília Air Force Base (BABR).

Brunei 

His Majesty The Sultan's Flight (HMSF) has several aircraft in VIP configuration exclusively for the Sultan of Brunei and members of the Royal Family.

 Boeing 767-200ER In service 1992
 Boeing 747-8 BBJ In service 2016
 Boeing 787-8 In service 2019

Bulgaria 

In Bulgaria governmental VIP air transport is provided by the State aviation operator which is civilian state-owned company under the Prime Minister of Bulgaria's office. As of 2018 it operates an Airbus A319, a Dassault Falcon 2000, 2 Mil Mi-8s and an Agusta AW-109 Power for use by the President, the Prime Minister and other state officials.

Burkina Faso 
The government of Burkina Faso operates a Boeing 727 (registration XT-BFA) for medium range travel. For longer trips, it charters various business jets.

Burundi 
The government of Burundi operated a Gulfstream IV in 2015. They also tend to fly on commercial aircraft.

Cabo Verde 
The government tends to travel either on commercial or private aircraft.

Cambodia 

The Kingdom of Cambodia operated an Airbus A320 in 2015. They also occasionally flew on private jets.

Cameroon 
The government of Cameroon operated a Gulfstream III in 2015, and previously operated a basic-livery Boeing 767, but also have, in the past, hired private jets from private companies such as Mid East Jet, Comlux and Aviation Link for travel.

Canada 

The Royal Canadian Air Force operates five CC-150 Polaris aircraft (Airbus A310-300), flown by crews of 437 Transport Squadron based at CFB Trenton; four are configured as normal airliners with cargo transport and aerial refuelling capability, while one, No. 001, is operated in a VIP configuration and charged with flying the monarch, other members of the Royal Family, the governor general, the prime minister, and other high-ranking government officials and foreign dignitaries. The CC-150 Polaris is primarily used for long-distance trips; for short-distance trips, four CC-144 aircraft (Bombardier Challenger 600), operated by 412 Squadron are used. On 5 June 2020, it was announced that two of the CC-144 aircraft based on model 601 would be replaced by newer airframes based on model 650 due to issues of compatibility of the upcoming ADS-B standards.

Central African Republic
Government officials of the Central African Republic normally travel on chartered flights. For example, when President Faustin-Archange Touadéra travelled to Beijing for the Forum on China–Africa Cooperation summit, he flew on a chartered Air France Boeing 777.

Chad 

The government of Chad operated a McDonnell Douglas MD-87 in 2015. They also operated a Boeing Business Jet, ATR 72 and Dornier Do-328JET. For two years, they also travelled on a Comlux Malta Boeing 767-200, registration P4-CLA.

Chile 

The transportation of the President was formerly operated by state-owned flag carrier Lan Airlines, providing a Boeing 707 or a Boeing 737-200.

Nowadays, the transportation is under the responsibility of the Chilean Air Force, which operates the following aircraft:
 1 Boeing 737-500
 1 Beechcraft 200 King Air
 1 Gulfstream IV
 1 Boeing 767-300ER
 This aircraft was bought to replace the Boeing 737 in transcontinental flights.  it is the only VIP FACh aircraft which uses the standard Chilean military livery, considering its multipurpose as VIP and freight transporter.

Formerly, FACh used a Boeing 707-320C which is still in service for military purposes.

China, People's Republic of 

Air transportation for the CCP general secretary, president, premier or other government officials of China is managed and operated by the 34th division of People's Liberation Army Air Force. Eight Boeing 737-300s, two 737-700s, and four 737-800s, as well as three Airbus A319s are used for these missions.

A secondhand Boeing 767-300ER was purchased by the Chinese government for use by the then Chinese leader Jiang Zemin in 2000. An international incident occurred in 2001 when the government claimed it had discovered 27 bugs embedded in the aircraft's interior. The aircraft had been refitted in San Antonio, Texas. It has since been converted back to a normal passenger airliner and sold.

A commercial Air China Boeing 747-4J6 has in the past, been converted for international travel when necessary. The three 747-400 used for this purpose have the following registrations: B-2445, B-2447, B-2472. At least one of them are specially retrofitted during official use and returns to commercial service afterwards; however since 2020, all 747-400s have officially been retired from government use and have since been converted to a commercial-only configuration.

A Boeing 747-8I with Air China branding with registration B-2479 was converted and tested for exclusive use as head of state transport. Although no official photos have been released, people speculate that the interior is fitted with conference tables, private bedrooms, office suites, and more. 

Lower officials such as the vice-president, are transported in an Air China Airbus A330 under the registration B-6131.

In order not to confuse air traffic control between a VIP flight and a normal flight, planes carrying government officials fly under the callsign CA1 to CA99, since all commercial callsigns of Air China are from CA100 and above.

China, Republic of (Taiwan) 

Air transportation for the President or other high-ranking officials of the Republic of China is operated by the Republic of China Air Force using a customized Boeing 737-800 delivered from Boeing in 2001 called the Air Force 3701. This aircraft operates out of Taipei's Songshan Airport and is not usually permitted to fly to countries without diplomatic relations with the ROC. Instead, a Boeing 777 or Airbus A350 operated by China Airlines or Eva Airways will be used, and is the type used for long-haul trips by the President and his/her staff. In addition, another three Fokker 50 turboprop perform the executive jet role for the Vice President of the Republic, premier, and other senior officials.

Colombia 

In 1933, Colombia acquired its first presidential transport aircraft, a Junkers Ju 52/3m, one of the most advanced aircraft of that time. It served former President Enrique Olaya Herrera until its retirement from service in 1950. From 1953 to 1972, a Douglas C-54 Skymaster served as the presidential aircraft starting with the dictatorship of Gustavo Rojas Pinilla (1953–57).

In 1972 a new Fokker F28-1000 became the presidential aircraft during the presidency of Misael Pastrana Borrero.

In 2005, Colombia operated the following aircraft for presidential transport:

The Colombian president may use the modified "Jupiter" Boeing KC-767 for longer-range flights.

Comoros 
The Comorian government flies on commercial aircraft, or they fly on other countries' government aircraft, e.g. when a delegation travelled to Russia for the Russia-Africa Summit, they travelled on Niger's 737BBJ.

Congo, Democratic Republic of the 
The DRC government have operated various different aircraft over the years.

A most notable used aircraft is an ex-Qantas Boeing 707, painted in a Boeing style livery. Other aircraft operated include a Boeing 727 and Gulfstream, but the government also tend to hire commercial and private aircraft.

Congo, Republic of the 
The government have previously operated a Dassault Falcon 7X, however it was impounded at Paris Le Bourget Airport for various reasons and has since been stored. They have nowadays resorted to hiring private jets.

Costa Rica 
The Air Surveillance Service is a department in the Ministry of Public Security which is in charge of police surveillance in airspace. This department has one Beechcraft King Air F90-1 and one MD 600N helicopter. The aircraft are available for surveillance and transportation for the President of Costa Rica and other government dignitaries. In 2018 Costa Rica bought one Beechcraft King Air 250.

Croatia 

Pilots of the Croatian Air Force fly a low-visibility grey VIP-configured Challenger CL-604 9A-CRO business-jet, acquired in August 1997 to be used by the President, Government and Parliament officials, and other users upon the approval of the Prime Minister, especially in the case of flights for the transportation of organs or seriously injured persons. Additionally, Mil Mi-8-1 twin-turbine helicopter is occasionally used for the short-range travel within the country. Directorate for the Use of Official Aircraft is an expert service of the Government that operates the aircraft.

Cuba 
Transportation for the First Secretary of the Communist Party of Cuba, President and Prime Minister is the responsibility of Cubana de Aviación, one of Cuba's state-owned airlines. Although the entire fleet is available for presidential use, the most commonly used aircraft are 2 Ilyushin Il-96.

The government of Cuba operated an Ilyushin Il-62 and Ilyushin Il-96 in 2015.

Cyprus
The government of Cyprus use a rented Dassault Falcon 7X for travel.
 
August 2022 - The government of Cyprus received as a gift from the government of Greece the 2012 build Embraer ERJ 135. It is a twin engine and 30-seat jet.

Czech Republic 

The Czech Air Force operates two Airbus A319CJs, and Mil Mi-8 helicopters for VIP transport, primarily that of the President, Prime Minister, and members of Government and Parliament of the Czech Republic.

Denmark 

The Royal Danish Air Force operates four Bombardier Challenger 604s for VIP transport, primarily that of the government and The Danish Royal Family. These aircraft are also used for environmental control and fishery control around Greenland and the North Sea. Furthermore, the Danish Royal Family have one AgustaWestland EH101 Merlin at their disposal. Ministers also fly on commercial airlines such as Scandinavian Airlines.

Djibouti
Djibouti government has a Dassault Falcon 7X.

Dominica
The government flies on turbo-prop or commercial aircraft.

Dominican Republic
The Air Force of the Dominican Republic or Fuerza Aérea de República Dominicana maintains the presidential helicopter fleet, which includes a Bell 430 and Eurocopter AS365 Dauphin and Eurocopter EC155 models, to transport the President of the Dominican Republic. For overseas and long-distance travel the president is transported on an Aero Commander 500.

The government of the Dominican Republic operated a Beech Super King Air in 2015.

Ecuador

Ecuador had a Dassault Falcon 7X and an Embraer Legacy 600 for presidential long and short range transport respectively, both acquired in recent years by Rafael Correa's government. They replaced an older fleet of Rockwell Sabreliners and Avro 748s. In 2021, president Guillermo Lasso ordered the retirement and sale of the presidential plane as part of a decree to "rationalize public spending and balance the national budget by selling unproductive assets whose conservation would be inefficient or unnecessary".

Egypt

The government of Egypt operated an Airbus A340-200 along with a number of business jets including the Gulfstream IV and Dassault Falcon 20s in 2015.

The first presidential aircraft in Egypt was a gift from Saudi Arabia to Egyptian President Anwar Sadat. Before that, the President of Egypt, Gamal Abdel Nasser, traveled using a rented aircraft from Egypt Air.

On September 10, 2021, it was announced that the Egyptian government had acquired a Boeing 747-8I for use as a VIP transport aircraft. The 747, which had originally been ordered by Lufthansa as D-ABYE, had not been accepted by the airline and spent a number of years in the Mojave Desert as N828BA.

In addition to air force aircraft, a number of aircraft are directly under government control to transfer the President of Egypt, presidential logistics, the Prime Minister and members of the government, including:

El Salvador
El Salvador's President Nayib Bukele uses a de luxe version of the Bell 412 helicopter for local flights. The President also has military aircraft, helicopters and a presidential turboprop for his use.

For international flights, a Beechjet 400A is used from its base at Ilopango Airport in the capital, San Salvador, and for long-haul flights, commercial aircraft are used.

Equatorial Guinea
The government of Equatorial Guinea previously used aircraft from Ceiba Intercontinental, a Malabo-based airline, for international travel. This has since been discontinued and a separate Boeing 777-200LR is used solely for government officials.

Eritrea
The government of Eritrea operated a Bombardier Challenger in 2015. They can also rent private jets or fly on commercial.

Estonia
The government of Estonia use private jets or commercial aircraft for travel.

Eswatini

The government of Eswatini operates McDonnell Douglas MD-87 and Airbus A340-300.

Fiji
The government uses commercial aircraft, e.g. Fiji Airways, for travel abroad, or they can use government aircraft borrowed from other countries.

Finland

Finnish officials do not have individually allotted aircraft. The president and cabinet ministers usually travel on commercial flights. However, the Finnish Air Force operates three Learjet 35 aircraft with limited transport capability for use by senior government and military officials. Helicopters of the Finnish Army or Coast Guard are utilized to provide transport to senior officials on some domestic trips.

Former prime minister Juha Sipilä, an avid aviator, has also made official trips with aircraft that he has personally flown and paid for, such as a Cessna CitationJet/M2 525 and a Scanwings Cessna 525 (OH-SWI). The longest trip was to Ulaan Baatar in 2016. The government leases private jets from companies such as Jetflite Oy.

France 

The Escadron de Transport 60, formerly Escadron de transport, d'entrainement et de calibration 00.065 (ETEC 65, "Transportation, training and calibration squadron"), is the unit of the French Air Force, under direct command of the Minister of Defence, in charge of the transportation of the President, the Prime Minister and other French government officials.

The squadron operates four Dassault Falcon 50s, two Dassault Falcon 900s, two Dassault Falcon 7Xs and an Airbus A330-200. Additionally, the unit operates three VIP-configured Super Puma helicopters.

French officials also use the aircraft of the Escadron de transport 3/60 Esterel, which operates three Airbus A310-304 and two Airbus A340-200s.

Both Airbus A340-200 aircraft have been sold to Kenya for AMREF Flying Doctors.

Gabon
Before 2016, the Gabonese government operated one second-hand Boeing 777-200 for use by the President of Gabon. It was previously owned by British Airways, Khalifa Airways, leased from Air Algerie, then stored at Boeing after the lease. After it was bought, the aircraft was ferried to Charlotte Airport to be converted to VIP use, then ferried to Libreville. Due to the Gabonese government failing to pay US$8 million for cabin outfitting, it was impounded at Orly Airport in February 2015 before returning to service two months later. It is currently stored. Nowadays, the government travels on rented private jets.

Gambia

The government of Gambia operated a Boeing 727 and a Bombardier Challenger in 2015. A previously used Ilyushin Il-62 was also stored. All these planes, however, have since been scrapped.

Georgia
Georgian Airways operated a single Bombardier Challenger 850 since 2007 to carry the President of Georgia and government officials. In 2011, a Gulfstream 450 was added to its inventory, possibly replacing the Challenger in its VIP transport role.

Germany 

The fleet used by Germany's senior government officials consists of 15 aircraft:
They use two Airbus A340-313X VIP aircraft, previously of Germany's Lufthansa, redesigned by Lufthansa Technik in a VIP configuration, including sleeping rooms and an anti-missile system. The aircraft are named after Konrad Adenauer, the first chancellor of (West) Germany, and Theodor Heuss, its first President. Until 2011 Germany's government officials used two Airbus A310-304 VIP carrying the same names, previously of East Germany's Interflug. In April 2019, Germany's "Luftwaffe" ordered three Airbus A350-900 as their new government planes and as a replacement for the aging A340s.

In Summer 2019, the Luftwaffe also ordered three Bombardier Global 6000 as an addition to the existing fleet.

Ghana

The government of Ghana operate a Dassault Falcon 900EX (Registered as 9G-EXE).

Greece 
Greece's prime minister has a Gulfstream V at his disposal, which is under the operational command of the Hellenic Air Force. The aircraft was bought by the government of Costas Simitis for the needs of Greece's 2003 EU presidency and the preparations of the 2004 Olympic Games. The VIP transport squadron (112 Combat Wing at the Elefsis Air Force Base) of the Hellenic Air Force also operates two Embraer business jets. For long haul flights the Prime Minister and other officials used one of the Airbus A340-300s of the government owned Olympic Airlines when they were still in service. The A340 aircraft were used for the official visit of the Greek Prime minister to Australia in 2007.

Two other aircraft used over the last two decades for the same purpose raised controversy. A Dassault Falcon 900 had a range of technical problems culminating in an accident that cost the life of the deputy minister of foreign affairs Giannos Kranidiotis and five other people due to severe in-flight pitch oscillations 20 minutes before landing at Bucharest on 9 September 1999.

Under executive order 2954/28-8-12, the Greek government bestowed the 30-seat Embraer to the Hellenic Air Force to be used for pilot training, patient airlift and organ transplant transportation.

In 2021 the Hellenic Air Force added a Falcon 7X to its fleet for VIP transport duties.

Grenada
The government uses turbo-prop or commercial aircraft for travel.

Guatemala

The Guatemalan President usually travels in a Guatemalan Air Force Beechcraft King Air 300 turboprop aircraft, with capacity for 10 passengers, for international travels, or in a Guatemalan Air Force Bell 412 helicopter for travels inside Guatemala. For longer flights, or flights when the Guatemalan Air Force aircraft are unavailable, the president has been known to travel using commercial travel, or rented civilian aircraft.

Guinea 
The government operated a Turkish-owned Gulfstream for travel, among other private and commercial aircraft. A notable private aircraft was a Royal Jet 737 which was temporarily painted in a "Republic of Guinea" livery for use during a trip to Russia.

Guinea-Bissau 
The government flies on commercial aircraft, and one time used a Mauritania Airlines 737 to travel to Washington for a summit, along with the President of Mauritania.

Guyana 
The government uses turbo-prop and commercial aircraft.

Haiti 
The government uses turbo-prop and commercial aircraft.

Honduras 

The Honduran President used an IAI Westwind aircraft owned by the Honduran Air Force until October 2014 when it was changed for an Embraer Legacy 600. Newly elected president Xiomara Castro (2022) promised during her presidential campaign to sell the aircraft and fly commercial and use the money for social projects for the poor.

Hong Kong 
The chief executive of Hong Kong travels on commercial aircraft, usually operated by Cathay Pacific. He/she travels within the territory on helicopters operated by the Government Flying Service.

Hungary 
The Hungarian government uses two Dassault Falcon 7X and two Airbus A319 airliners.

Iceland 
The government uses commercial aircraft and private aircraft for travel.

India 

Air India One (AIC001) is the callsign of any aircraft with the President, Vice President or the Prime Minister of India on board. For international travel, two dedicated Indian Air Force Boeing 777-300ERs with registrations K7066 and K7067 which arrived in October 2020 are used. The aircraft are equipped with encrypted satellite communication facilities and advanced navigation aids. The jets are also equipped with an advanced missile warning system, a missile deflecting shield, and electronic countermeasures to provide protection from any ground-based or airborne threat. The aircraft are also equipped with flares and glares to mislead any missile.

For domestic and short distance international travel, three Boeing 737BBJ aircraft are used. The three Boeing Business Jets also used by the President, the Vice President or the Prime Minister were inducted in 2008. The jets are also equipped with an advanced missile warning system, a missile deflecting shield and electronic counter measures so as to provide protection from any ground-based or airborne threats.

Other aircraft used by other government officials are four 14-seater Embraer 135s and four 20-seater Embraer 145s.

Apart from these aircraft, there are several helicopters used such as the Mi-8 for carrying the President and the Prime Minister for travelling shorter distances. These aircraft and helicopters are operated by the Indian Air Force.

Indonesia

As Indonesia is a sprawling archipelagic nation, the President of Indonesia frequently needs VVIP air transportation for visiting Indonesian provinces, attending international summits and meetings, and traveling on official foreign visits. Since April 2014, Indonesia has acquired Indonesia One, an aircraft dedicated for the President and their entourage.

Prior to having their own aircraft, the President and Vice President formerly used aircraft chartered from Garuda Indonesia for their air travels. Boeing 737-800s were used for domestic flights and short-range international flights, and Airbus A330-300s were used for most overseas trips and state visits. The Indonesian Air Force also has special VIP squadrons for the President, Vice President and government ministers. These are the 17th Air Squadron operating Avro RJ85, Boeing 737-400, Falcon 7X and 8X, and Lockheed L-100 fixed-wing aircraft; and the 45th Air Squadron flying Aérospatiale AS 332L-1 Super Puma helicopters. Both squadrons are based at Halim Perdanakusuma Airforce Base, Jakarta, and almost all presidential flights depart from there.

On 10 April 2014, Indonesia One was delivered to Jakarta. The government claimed the cost of operating its own aircraft would be lower than chartering Garuda aircraft. The aircraft is the Boeing Business Jet variant of the 737-800. The aircraft was designed to meet the minimum safety and security requirements of Indonesia's VVIP air transportation, and includes a modest self-defense system.

In 2020, the Indonesian government chartered a Boeing 777-300ER, registration PK-GIG, from Garuda Indonesia for special use as a presidential aircraft on long-haul flights; the aircraft is painted in a special livery.

Iran

Until the early 2010s, the supreme leader, the president and other high-ranking government officials of Iran were still using the aged but famous Shahin, a special VIP designed Boeing 707 which was ordered and purchased by the Shah of Iran in the 1970s. It was initially far more luxuriously outfitted than US Air Force One (also a Boeing 707 at the time), but after the Iranian Revolution in 1979 it was redesigned as a normal VIP aircraft. Another VIP airliner, an Airbus A321 which was purchased during the 1990s, is also used on medium range trips of high officials such as the Foreign Minister, the Speaker of Parliament and the Secretary of the Supreme National Security Council. The other VIP aircraft in use by the government consist of one Dassault Falcon 20, three Dassault Falcon 50s and a Lockheed JetStar all operated by the Iranian Air Force, and an Airbus A340-300, operated (along with the A321) by Meraj Airlines. The government of Iran had also occasionally chartered an A340-300 from Mahan Air prior to the acquisition of the current A340-300.

As of 2022, the Supreme Leader owns four planes: Airbus A340-313, Dassault Falcon 50, Dassault Falcon 900EX and the Airbus A321-231.

Iraq
As of 2020, the government of Iraq operates a Boeing 737-800.

Prior to 2014, it used a Boeing 767-200.

Former President Saddam Hussein had his own personal Boeing 747SP for his travel as well as few Boeing 727s and Dassault Falcons for Governmental use. Now, they travel on either a Boeing 737-800 or a Boeing 767-300ER from Iraqi Airways.

Ireland

The Irish Ministerial Air Transport Service (MATS) is part of the Irish Air Corps, it provides secure transport to the President of Ireland, the Taoiseach, the Tánaiste, and members of the government and their staff, both within and outside Ireland.

A Learjet 45 is currently used. Until recently, a Gulfstream IV was also part of the fleet. The Air Corps AW139 helicopters are also used as government transport.

Israel

As of 2019, the State of Israel is in the process of introducing a Boeing 767-300ER for VIP transport. Currently, whenever the Prime Minister flies long distances (out of the country), the government leases an airliner from El Al, the country's flag carrier. Meanwhile, the President and other high-ranking dignitaries are relegated to El Al first-class commercial service. For short-distance travels, a short-haul El Al aircraft or a low cost aircraft is used.

In 2016, approval was given for the acquisition of a dedicated aircraft for use by the Prime Minister. An aircraft was acquired and is currently undergoing a reported US$70 million modification program, much of which is classified but will include advanced secure communications capabilities as well as advanced missile defense system supplied by the Israeli electronics firm Elbit.

The aircraft, named the "Wing of Zion", was publicly exposed in late October 2019 to be an ex-Qantas Boeing 767-338ER,with the new tail number being 4X-ISR. On 3 November 2019, the aircraft took off for the first time since landing in Israel three years ago for a test flight, which took about four and a half hours. The aircraft is scheduled to enter service in late 2019.

Italy

The Italian Air Force operates three Airbus A319 Corporate Jets, three Dassault Falcon 900s and two Dassault Falcon 50s for government transport. Two AgustaWestland AW139 are operated for use by the President and government officials, and are also used by the Pope. An Airbus A340-500 was leased for longer-distance trips in 2016 and phased out in 2018. All aircraft and helicopters are operated by the 31st Wing based in Rome Ciampino Airport.

Ivory Coast (Côte d'Ivoire)
The Ivorian government uses a Gulfstream IV as a VIP aircraft. Furthermore, it also uses an Airbus A319 which has replaced a Boeing 727.

Jamaica
The Jamaican government charters either a commercial Airbus A340 for long haul flights and or a private Boeing BBJ 737-800 for shorter journeys. Various helicopters from the Jamaica Defense Force fleet may also be used.

Japan

Japan Air Self-Defense Force operates two Boeing 777-300ER aircraft for use by the Prime Minister, the Emperor, Empress and other members of the Imperial Family.

They have the radio callsigns Japanese Air Force One and Japanese Air Force Two when operating on official business, and Cygnus One and Cygnus Two when operating outside of official business (e.g., on training flights and ferry flights). The aircraft always fly together on government missions, with one serving as the primary transport and the other serving as a backup with maintenance personnel on board. The aircraft are officially referred to as Japanese government exclusive aircraft (日本国政府専用機 Nippon-koku seifu sen'yōki).

Until March 2019, two Boeing 747-400 aircraft were used. The aircraft were constructed at the Boeing factory at the same time as the United States Air Force One VC-25s, though the US aircraft were built to the 747-200 design, while the Japanese aircraft were built to the more contemporary 747-400 design. Both Japanese aircraft were delivered in 1990.

Jordan
The members of the royal family and government officials use an Airbus A318-112 Elite. They also can use either private aircraft or other government aircraft at their disposal.

Kazakhstan

The Kazakhstan government fleet consists of the following aircraft (August 2015):
1 x Boeing 737-700 BBJ
1 x Airbus A320
1 x Airbus A321 
1 x Tupolev Tu-154
1 x Boeing 757
1 x Airbus A330-200

Kenya
The government of Kenya operated a Fokker 70 officially named "Harambee One" in 2015. It was purchased in 1995 and used for the first time on 26 January 1996 by retired President Daniel Moi. Prior to the purchase of the Fokker, the Kenyan President primarily used Kenya Airways for his international travel. The Presidential fleet also includes Bombardier Dash 8 and Aerospatiale Puma, mostly for domestic travel.

Kiribati
The government of Kiribati uses commercial aircraft.

Korea, North (Democratic People's Republic of Korea) 

North Korean leader Kim Jong-un travels overseas on one of two VIP configured Ilyushin Il-62M aircraft of the Korean People's Army Air Force operated by Air Koryo crew, known as Chammae-1. Kim Jong-un's private aircraft is known as Goshawk-1.

Korea, South (Republic of Korea) 

Since April 2010, a Boeing 747-400, leased from Korean Air to the Republic of Korea Air Force, conducts official international travels by the President of South Korea. The aircraft is based in Seoul Air Base and operational support is provided by Korean Air. At first, even pilots and flight attendants were from Korean Air, but now, experienced pilots from the Republic of Korea Air Force operate the plane. The lease, renewed in December 2014, lasts until April 2020 and in June 2018, the government requested Korean Air and Asiana airlines to confirm their bids for the next contract. Before the 747-400 was leased, the President used a Boeing 737-300 for short-distance trips and chartered a Boeing 747 aircraft belonging to Korean Air or Asiana Airlines for longer distance trips. In the latter case, the presidential seal would be mounted on the forward passenger door to show that that aircraft is carrying the President.
 
The VIP aircraft, known by the callsign "Code One", has been highly modified with much of the technology onboard being classified. What is publicly known is that the VIP aircraft has infrared vision, secure satellite communication, secure telephone communications, a missile defense system, a missile deflection system, and is made out of a special metal to reduce its radar footprint. It also has had a complete renovation of the interior of the plane, turning the plane into a flying command center so the President can continue his or her duties. When in operation, another aircraft acts as a decoy and a spare.
 
The Air Force also operates one Boeing 737-300 and several CASA/IPTN CN-235s for government travel. The 737, in service since 1983, was used in the country's first presidential visit to Pyongyang in 2000.
 
A Sikorsky S-92, acquired in 2007, is used as a presidential helicopter. It has secure telephone communications, secure satellite communications, Infrared vision, missile defense system and is made out of a special metal that makes it hard to detect on radar systems. Two other helicopters fly with it as decoys and spares. The helicopter is based at Seoul Air Base.

Kuwait

Until April 2013, the Emir of Kuwait used a Boeing 747-400; since then he has used either one of two Airbus A340-500 airframes equipped with military defense equipment to protect the aircraft from any potential attacks, or since 2016, a Boeing 747-8 equipped similarly to the A340s. The aircraft are also used by the Crown Prince of Kuwait.

The rest of the official state aircraft used by senior ruling family members and cabinet members consist of:

Kyrgyzstan

The government of Kyrgyzstan operated a single Tupolev Tu-154M in 2010.

Laos
The Lao Government uses Lao Airlines Airbus A320s (RDPL-34199) for government trips, and uses a Xian MA-600 for special squadron flights and private travels.

Lebanon

For his local and regional trips, the Lebanese president uses a Lebanese Air Force VIP variant of an AgustaWestland AW139 code named "Cedar 1"; the helicopter was a gift from the Emir of Qatar HH Hamad bin Khalifa Al Thani. The Lebanese president uses Middle East Airlines (MEA) jets for his international trips. MEA aircraft use "Cedar Jet 1" as a special call sign when they are transporting the president.

Lesotho
The government uses turbo-prop, commercial or private aircraft for travel.

Liberia
The government uses a French-registered Dassault Falcon 900EX for travel.

Libya
The government of Libya operated an Airbus A340-200 and a Dassault Falcon 900EX in 2015.

Liechtenstein
The government tends to not travel a lot, however, commercial aircraft is used if necessary.

Lithuania

The President and the government of Lithuania use one of the three Alenia C-27J Spartans of the Lithuanian Air Force in a passenger configuration.

Luxembourg

A private Cessna 550 Citation II, a Learjet 35A or even a 737-700 chartered from the flag carrier Luxair are sometimes used for governmental flights.

Macau 

The Chief Executive of Macau travels abroad (and to mainland China destinations) on commercial aircraft operated by Air Macau, the de facto flag carrier of the territory. As Macau is a small locale, there is no need for air travel within the territory.

Madagascar
The government of Madagascar operated a Boeing 737-300 in 2015. That was retired and they now use commercial or private planes.

Malawi
During the presidency of Bingu wa Mutharika, the government operated a Dassault Falcon 900. After his death in 2012, the new president, Joyce Banda, sold it to a private company to use the money for the poor. The President of Malawi now travels abroad on chartered aircraft.

Malaysia

Malaysia's Prime Minister and Yang di-Pertuan Agong (Ruling Monarch) travel aboard aircraft operated by the Royal Malaysian Air Force. For this purpose, an Airbus ACJ319 named Perdana 1 was purchased in 2007, and an Airbus ACJ320 named Perdana 2 in 2015. Other fixed wing aircraft in use include a Dassault Falcon 900, a Bombardier Global Express BD-700, and a Boeing 737-800 BBJ. Helicopters including three S-70 Black Hawks and three S-61A4 Nuris are also used. Also latest addition to the fleet is 9M-JPM Agusta Westland AW139.

Maldives
The government uses commercial aircraft.

Mali

The government of Mali operated a Boeing 737-700/BBJ in 2015.

Malta
The government uses a Learjet for travel.

Marshall Islands
The government uses commercial aircraft.

Mauritania 
Mauritanian President Mohamed Ould Ghazouani does not own a personal aircraft. Instead, whenever he travels overseas or domestically, he borrows a Mauritania Airlines Boeing 737-800 registration 5T-CLE, or an Embraer 145 registration 5T-CLD. The old president, Mohamed Ould Abdel Aziz on his trips to New York, and Pyongyang and Beijing, flew in a Mauritania Airlines’ Boeing 737 MAX 8, registration 5T-CLJ.

Mauritius 
The government tends to use commercial or private aircraft for travel.

Mexico 

President Andrés Manuel López Obrador (2018) currently flies commercial and plans to sell the entire presidential aircraft fleet to use the money for social projects for the poor. However, as of 2022 the presidential plane, a highly customized 787 costing $160 million, has not been sold. The president recently suggested renting the aircraft for weddings and quinceaneras. The 787 will be parked at the newly completed Felipe Angeles Airport. The airplane has begun to produce revenue through licensings for souvenirs, plus planned walk-throughs for curious visitors worth $40 pesos each.

As of February 2016, the air fleet of the President of Mexico had a total of 18 aircraft which are described below:

In 2012, the Mexican government announced the acquisition through a 15-year lease of a Boeing 787-8 Dreamliner. The new presidential aircraft (TP-01) incorporates modern security systems; named José María Morelos y Pavón, it started operations in December 2015. President Enrique Peña Nieto used the aircraft for the first time at the Air Force 101st anniversary ceremony on 10 February 2016.

Moldova
In the 1990s, the Moldovan government operated a single Tupolev TU-134 for use by the government. In the 2000s, it was retired, and the Moldovan government leased an Air Moldova Yakovlev Yak-40 for VIP use. That was retired too, and the most recent aircraft used by the President or Prime Minister is an Air Moldova Airbus A320 family jet.

Monaco

The Prince and the Monegasque government (including the Minister of State) use a Dassault Falcon 7X based in the French airport of Nice Côte d'Azur Airport.

Since 2018 the prince and the government of Monaco uses a Dassault Falcon 8X with the same registration - 3A-MGA.

Mongolia

The Mongolian President and Prime Minister with other Parliament members use a Boeing 767-300ER or Boeing 737-800 for short to medium range from Government owned by MIAT Mongolian Airlines. In domestic routes, the head of Mongolia and other government officials use Saab 340B or Fokker 50 chartered from Eznis Airways and Aero Mongolia. Currently Mongolian Government is in talks with Cessna to purchase Cessna Citation jets. The number is unknown.

Montenegro
The Government of Montenegro operates one Learjet 45 for VIP transport. registration 4O-MNE

Morocco

The Moroccan Air Force operates a fleet of VIP aircraft for use by Moroccan officials, including King Mohammed VI and Prime Minister Aziz Akhannouch:

A fleet of smaller jets and Beechcraft Super King Air 200/350 turboprops, is also occasionally used for VIP-transport of the royal family, ministers and armed forces senior staff.

Mozambique
During Communist rule, a Tupolev TU-134AK was used by the government for travel. However, the aircraft was written off in a crash in South Africa which killed the President and government officials.

In 2017, reports arose that President Filipe Nyusi had bought a $7 million private jet, which was spotted being used to transport the President to Robert Mugabe's inauguration.

Myanmar
The government uses various commercial airliners for travel, particularly airlines based in Myanmar. If that is not available, however, other commercial aircraft or government aircraft from other countries is used. Reports emerged inFebruary 2023 that former president U Thein Sein was planning on buying a plane specifically for VIP government use, choosing an Antonov 148 after sanctions prohibited the acquisition of an Airbus, Boeing, or Embraer aircraft, however this plan was scrapped after the selected plane crashed during a test flight in Eastern Russia.

Namibia
The Namibian government uses a Dassault Falcon 7x and Dassault Falcon 900 for VIP transport. For domestic flights, a Learjet 31A and two AW139 helicopters are also used, with a Learjet 45 soon to be acquired.

Nauru
The government uses commercial aircraft.

Nepal
The present President of Nepal, Prime Minister of Nepal, and other senior government officials travel on regular scheduled commercial flights or chartered flights by either Nepal Airlines or Himalaya Airlines. There is no plane used specifically for the VIP operations.

Netherlands

The government of the Netherlands operates a Boeing 737 BBJ as a means of transport for the Dutch Royal family and government officials such as the prime minister and other ministers. It is used not only to attend international conferences but also for private trips by the King Willem Alexander (who is a licensed commercial pilot type rated to fly the 737) and Queen Maxima. This aircraft, registered PH-GOV (GOVernment), was introduced in 2019 at a cost of 89m Euro. A Fokker 70 registered PH-KBX (Koningin Beatrix) had been operated, but was retired in May 2017 in line with the withdrawal of the Fokker 70 from the fleet of KLM Cityhopper which had maintained the aircraft. Prior to the introduction of the Fokker 70, a Fokker F28 Fellowship registered PH-PBX (Princess BeatriX) had been used.

A Gulfstream IV of the Royal Netherlands Air Force (RNLAF) is also available.

New Zealand

The Royal New Zealand Air Force maintains two Boeing 757-200s which are occasionally used to transport the Governor-General, the Prime Minister, various other government officials, as well as members of the Royal Family when on New Zealand business. As multi-role aircraft, they are more often used as transport aircraft for troops or freight. Generally, the Prime Minister and government officials use commercial or chartered flights (with Air New Zealand where available) to travel both domestically and internationally. The 757s replaced a pair of aging Boeing 727s.

Nicaragua
The government uses turbo-prop or commercial aircraft for travel.

Niger
The Government of Niger used to operate a Boeing 737-200Adv for official flights. This was stored in 2014 and replaced by a Boeing 737-700 (BBJ).

Nigeria

The Nigerian Air Force currently maintains a Boeing Business Jet (737) as a means of transport for the President of Nigeria. The aircraft is known as "Eagle One" and is marked NAF-001. In addition, there is a Gulfstream V-SP, a Gulfstream 550, two Falcon 7Xs, a Dornier 228 and three A139 helicopters. The Falcon 900s (two), a GIV-SP, and G II were all destroyed on advice by the Presidential Guard Brigade. A Citation Bravo and Hawker 800 were returned to the Air Force.

North Macedonia
The government of the Republic of North Macedonia operated a Learjet 25B and a Learjet 60 in 2015.

Norway

The air transport of the King and Prime Minister of Norway is mostly handled by commercial airliners with the VIPs travelling as normal passengers. However, the Norwegian government will charter small private jets for government ministers when needed. The Royal Norwegian Air Force 717 Squadron at Rygge Air Station also maintain one Dassault Falcon 20 (5–9 passengers) for VIP-transport of the royal family, ministers and armed forces senior staff.

Oman

The Royal Flight of Oman operates the following aircraft for use by the Sultan of Oman and members of his government.

Pakistan

The history of executive transport dates back to the earliest days of Pakistan. After independence in August 1947, the need for an official aircraft for head of state was felt strongly. For this purpose, an ex-British Imperial Air Force Vickers VC.1 Viking was procured to serve as the official transport of the Governor-General of Pakistan. This aircraft is considered as the first to use the call sign reserved for an aircraft flying Pakistan's head of state or head of government, 'PAKISTAN ONE'. Pakistan's first Governor-General, Quaid-e-Azam Muhammad Ali Jinnah was the first to fly in this aircraft, using it until his death on 11 September 1948. After his death, the new Governor-General, Khawaja Nazimuddin used the aircraft as his official transport until 1953, when the aircraft was retired. It remained parked at Karachi's Mauripur Airbase and then at a PAF Base in Peshawar. In 1997, the aircraft was disassembled and transported to Karachi via road. In Karachi, it was restored and put up for display at the Pakistan Air Force Museum.

Following that, in the 1960s and 70s, the President of Pakistan: Muhammad Ayub Khan, Yahya Khan and Zulfiqar Ali Bhutto used Boeing 707 jetliners of the national flag carrier, Pakistan International Airlines. 
In the 1980s, President Muhammad Zia-ul-Haq used Lockheed C-130B Hercules. In the '90s, Prime Ministers Nawaz Sharif and Benazir Bhutto used a Boeing 737 for their official trips. The airliner was maintained by Pakistan Government Transport. PIA always transports the presidents and Prime Ministers of Pakistan on overseas visits. During the late 1990s, Prime Minister Sharif's government bought a Boeing 737-300 for official use. 
Initially it was given to PIA for commercial use while it was not on official duty. However, when the government changed after a military coup in 1999, the aircraft was transferred to PIA permanently. The President and Prime Minister then resorted to using two of PIA's Airbus A310s for official visits, while rare trips were done on regular commercial flights of the airline. In 2007 Qatar government gifted an Airbus A310-300 of Qatar Amiri Flight to Pakistan, it was operated for the Pakistan Air Force by PIA.

Since 2010 Gulfstream IV is being operated by Pakistan Air Force with serial number J-755, J-756 and four AW 139 helicopters are also on President and Prime Minister disposal every time.

Palau
The government uses turbo-prop or commercial aircraft for travel.

Panama

The government of Panama operated two aircraft for transportation of the President of Panama: one Embraer ERJ 145 (reg.no: HP-1A) for oversea flights and one Sikorsky S-76 (reg.no: HP-A1A) for domestic flights. National Aeronaval Service is responsible for the maintenance and operation of the aircraft though they do not belong to them. As of 2022, Panama is the only Central American country with a presidential jet aircraft.

Papua New Guinea
The government uses a Dassault Falcon 900EX (Reg: P2-ANW) for overseas travel, or they use commercial.

Paraguay
The government uses a Cessna 680 Citation Sovereign (reg: FAP-3001) for travel, painted in the colors of the Paraguayan flag. Previously, aircraft like a Boeing 707 were used.

Peru

The official aircraft of the President of Peru is a Boeing 737-500 acquired in 1995 during Alberto Fujimori's presidency. President Pedro Castillo (2021) has promised to sell the aircraft and fly commercial, use the money for health and education for the poor, as well as considering banning government officials from flying first class.

Philippines

The 250th Presidential Airlift Wing of the Philippine Air Force is used to transport the President of the Philippines and the First Family. On occasion, the wing has also been tasked to provide transportation for other members of government, visiting heads of state, and other state guests.

The fleet includes: one Fokker F28, which is primarily used for the President's domestic trips and it is also called Kalayaan (Filipino "Freedom") One when the President is on board, one Fokker F27 aircraft, and seven Bell 412 helicopters. In October 2019, the government purchased an Airbus C-295 and a Gulfstream G280 for use by the President and other senior officials which were then delivered in April 2019 and September 2020 respectively. A Hawker 800XP business jet was donated by San Miguel Corporation in May 2022.

For trips outside of the Philippines, the President uses a Learjet 60, Challenger 850 or charters appropriate aircraft from Philippine Airlines. The aircraft with the flight number PR/PAL 001 and callsign PHILIPPINE 001 is a special aircraft operated by Philippine Airlines to transport the President. These aircraft have the Presidential Seal on the front left door. The Airbus A320 and Airbus A321 are used for short-haul flights, while the Airbus A330-300, Airbus A350-900 and Boeing 777-300ER are used for medium or long haul flights.

The presidential aircraft of President Laurel was a Mitsubishi MC-20. A PAAC Douglas C-47 Skytrain named Lili Marlene was designated as the presidential plane of President Roxas. This aircraft crashed in May 1947, and few months later was replaced by a C-47 of the newly formed Philippine Air Force.  President Quirino used a plane named Laong Laan (Filipino "Kept in reserve for a purpose for a long time.") which during the Garcia administration was renamed Dagohoy. President Magsaysay used two PAF C-47 presidential planes, the Pagasa (Filipino "Hope") and the Mt. Pinatubo. During the Macapagal presidency the Pag-asa was renamed Common Man and was also used by President Marcos Sr. Prior to 1962, the Air Force chartered aircraft from Pan American World Airways as the international services of Philippine Airlines were suspended.

Toward the end of the Marcos Sr. administration, the squadron of presidential aircraft consisted of: one Boeing 707, one BAC One-Eleven, one NAMC YS-11 and one Fokker F28 Fellowship airliner; along with one Sikorsky S-62A, two Bell UH-1N, one Aérospatiale SA 330 Puma and two Sikorsky S-70AS helicopters. President Corazon Aquino used some of these aircraft.

Poland

As of June 2022, the Polish Government operates a fleet of five aircraft for VIP transport. This includes two Boeing BBJ2 in custom configuration for 65 passengers and featuring secure communication systems as well as anti-missile defense systems, one reconfigured Boeing 737-800NG with 132 seats, and two Gulfstream G550 each capable of carrying 16 passengers. The aircraft are operated and maintained by the Polish Air Force 1st Airlift Air Base.

During People's Republic of Poland the aircraft used for head of state transport included Lisunov Li-2, Ilyushin Il-14, Il-18, Tupolev Tu-134A, Yakovlev Yak-40. From 1990 the Polish Air Force operated two modified Tupolev Tu-154M Lux, additionally a number of Yakovlev Yak-40 and PZL M28 Bryza fixed-wing aircraft, Mil Mi-8, PZL W-3 Sokół and Bell 412 helicopters were used by 36th Special Aviation Regiment in Warsaw. On 4 December 2003, a Polish Air Force Mil Mi-8 carrying the Polish prime minister crashed in a forest near Warsaw. Even though the helicopter was lost, all 15 people on board survived. Tu-154M tail number 101, carrying the President of Poland Lech Kaczyński, crashed in April 2010. The remaining Tu-154M and all Yak-40s were retired in 2011, while the 36th Regiment was disbanded. Due to lack of the VIP fleet both the president and prime minister often used Polish Air Force EADS CASA C-295Ms for domestic flight and due to civil aviation restrictions.

Between June 2010 and December 2018 the Government of Poland used two Embraer ERJ-175LR (ERJ-170-200LR) leased from LOT Polish Airlines to carry out state flights. Since 2012 Polish Air Force 1st Airlift Air Base in Warsaw-Okecie operates VIP helicopters for domestic transportation and since 2018 the long range passenger jets. The HEAD instruction for organizing the flights within the Polish Armed Forces gives the HEAD flight status when there is the president, prime minister or the parliament speakers on board. The flights carried by LOT are operated with both the rules of the civil procedures and in line with the unofficial civil HEAD instruction.

Portugal

The Portuguese Air Force operates three Dassault Falcon 50s for use by the President of the Republic and the Prime Minister, as well as cabinet members and other dignitaries when appropriate. They are operated by the 504 Squadron "Lynxes", based at the Lisbon Military Airfield (AT1).

Additionally, for similar use, the Portuguese Air Force maintained three Dassault Falcon 20s, bought from FedEx as cargo aircraft and converted to VIP configuration maintaining the outsized cargo door. These aircraft are no longer operational, the last one being used as an Aeronautical Navigation Calibration aircraft.

The three Dassault Falcon 50 are also often used for long range emergency human organ transports and medical evacuation, mainly from and to the Portuguese islands of Azores and Madeira.

Dassault Falcon 50s are not designed to fly long-haul, so for long-haul flights, the government would travel on a charter flight.

Qatar

The government-owned carrier Qatar Amiri Flight is used to transport royal and other VIP government personnel.

Romania

Romania operated one Boeing 707 for the Romanian President, a BAC 1-11 mostly for the prime minister, and a SA-365 Dauphin for internal transport. The operator of these flights was the Ministry of National Defense, the owner of Romavia.

When Romavia was shutdown in October 2010, the presidential administration chartered an Airbus A310-300 from TAROM.

As of 2016, Romania no longer has an official aircraft, but a project to acquire one or more has been approved.

Russia

Russia State Transport Company operates two Ilyushin Il-96-300PU for use of the President of Russia.

At least one of the aircraft was refitted as a VIP transport in 2001 by a British company for a price of GBP 10 million. The aircraft is reported to have an escape capsule, much like the one featured in the film Air Force One.

The Russian government fleet consists of the following aircraft (April 2016):

Rwanda
The government of Rwanda leases a Qatar Executive Gulfstream G650ER for travel.

Saint Kitts and Nevis
The government uses turbo-prop or commercial aircraft.

Saint Lucia
The government uses turbo-prop or commercial aircraft.

Saint Vincent and the Grenadines
The government uses turbo-prop and commercial aircraft.

Samoa
The government uses commercial aircraft.

San Marino
It is current unknown which aircraft are used by San Marinese officials for travel.

Sao Tome and Principe
The government uses commercial aircraft for travel.

Saudi Arabia

The Saudi royal family and government have multiple fleets of aircraft at their disposal. The Saudi Arabian Government operates a Boeing 747-300, a Boeing 747-400, a Boeing 757-200, an Airbus A340-200 and a Boeing 777-300ER for use by the King of Saudi Arabia. Saudi Royal Flight operates an Airbus A318 corporate jet. In the mid-2010s the Saudi government struck a deal with Boeing to purchase two Boeing 787s, registrations HZ-MF7 and HZ-MF8 for exclusive use by the Crown Prince of Saudi Arabia, Mohammed bin Salman. These aircraft were not painted in the normal Saudia livery, but in the livery for aircraft operated by the Saudi Ministry of Finance and Economy. Other aircraft operated by the Saudi Ministry of Finance and Economy are 3 Boeing 737 Business Jets and 3 Gulfstream G300s. Other aircraft used by Saudi royals are 2 Boeing 737-700 BBJ and 1 Gulfstream G450 operated by the Saudi Air Force, painted in an all-white livery with a Saudi flag on the tail and green stripes across the fuselage, and aircraft operated by Saudi Aramco.

Senegal

The government of Senegal operated an Airbus A319 (reg:6V-ONE) since 2011.

In July 2021, a new presidential aircraft Airbus A320neo (reg: 6V-SEN) was purchased, which caused heated debate in the country.

Serbia
The Avio Service of Serbia is responsible for transporting the Serbian President, the Prime Minister and other Serbian government officials. It operates a Dassault Falcon 50 and a Learjet 31A. The Ministry of the interior uses a Sikorsky S-76. The government sometimes also uses Yakovlev Yak-40 aircraft of the Serbian Air Force. At the end of 2018 Serbia got an Embraer Legacy 600 registered YU-SRB. These aircraft can not fly long haul, so when government officials are flying long-haul, they take hired aircraft from Air Serbia.

Seychelles
The government uses commercial aircraft for travel. In particular, during a state visit to Mauritius in November 2020, President Wavel Ramkalawan used a Beechcraft 1900D (reg: S7-DES ) from IDC Aviation (Islands Development Company).

Sierra Leone
The government uses commercial or private aircraft for travel.

Singapore

The President, Prime Minister of Singapore and government officials typically travel on regular scheduled commercial flights operated by Singapore's flag carrier, Singapore Airlines.

However, at APEC Philippines 2015, the Prime Minister travelled on a small Gulfstream G550.

Moreover, in case of need, the Singapore Government can count on the Republic of Singapore Air Force to provide airplanes such as the Airbus A330 MRTT and Fokker 50, specially retrofitted in passenger configurations.

Slovakia

The Slovak Government Flying Service operates two Airbus 319 – 115 ACE and two Fokker 100. The Slovak Government Flying Service operates also one helicopter Bell 429 for Slovak Police and two helicopters Mil-171 for use by the President, Prime Minister and government officials.

Slovenia

The Slovenian Armed Forces operate a Dassault Falcon 2000 EX state registration number: L1-01 (MSN: 15) for VIP transport, primarily of the President, Prime Minister, and members of the Government. The Government has decided in early 2015 to use the aircraft also for medical transportation of body organs. Another aircraft that is used for short flights and as a transport for military officers is the Let L-410 Turbolet state registration number: L4-01 (MSN: 912606).

Solomon Islands
The government uses commercial aircraft for travel.

Somalia
The government of Somalia operated a Beechcraft 1900 turboprop.

South Africa

The President of South Africa travels in a Boeing 737 (BBJ) ZS-RSA "Inkwazi" which is designated as "South African One" and operated by the South African Air Force's 21 Squadron, which is based at AFB Waterkloof near Pretoria, the executive capital, i.e. the seat of the executive branch of the South African government.

21 Squadron also operates a fleet of two Falcon 50s ZS-CAS and ZS-CAQ and a Falcon 900B ZS-NAN. The Falcon 900 is normally used by the Deputy President and high-ranking cabinet ministers.

In 2015 the South African president, president Jacob Zuma, had asked Armscor to procure a business jet with the capability of carrying at least 30 passengers and traveling long range distances and which is much larger than the current presidential jet (Inkwazi). Models being considered included the Boeing 777, Boeing 787 and Airbus A340. This purchase was never authorised and the plans for a new jet were scrapped after Zuma was removed as president.

South Sudan 
The government flies on a RwandAir 737, due to Rwanda having good relations with the government.

Spain 

The Spanish Air Force operates two customized Airbus A310s and five Falcon 900s, for transportation of the King, the Prime Minister, high-ranking government officials and the Spanish Royal Family. A new unit, an Airbus 330, is pending approval by the Council of Ministers of Spain. This will be the new official aircraft of the King and the Prime Minister. Usually when the Prime Minister and high-ranking officials travel, they use the Airbus A310 and use 1 of the Falcon 900s as a support aircraft.

Previously, Spanish Air Force Boeing KC-707Cs were utilized.

Sri Lanka 
The present President, present Prime Minister and government officials typically travel on regular scheduled commercial flights run by SriLankan Airlines, due to their policies.

However, domestic travel for senior government officials and VIPs are provided by the No. 4 (VIP) Helicopter Squadron of the Sri Lanka Air Force using seven Bell 412EPs, Bell 206 or Mil Mi-17. Fixed wing transport aircraft of the Sri Lanka Air Force are used, such as the Y-12, Y-8 or C-130, in case of an emergency.
In post-WW2 times, the de Havilland Heron, Douglas DC-3, de Havilland Dove, Westland WS-51 Dragonfly were used.

Sudan 
The former President of Sudan Omar al-Bashir typically used to travel on an Ilyushin Il-62 or a Dassault Falcon 50. Two Mil Mi-17 VIP helicopters are also used for domestic air transport.

Also in the government fleet there is a Dassault Falcon 900 (reg: ST-PSA)

In 2021 an A320 was noted in Abu Dhabi with Sudan government titles (registered A6-EIP). This will be the new government aircraft.

Suriname 
An Airbus A340-313 is chartered from Surinam Airways and has been used for international and long haul flights. For regional flights in the Caribbean, North-, Central-, and South America a Boeing 737-300 is also chartered from Surinam Airways. For domestic flights, a helicopter is chartered from Hi-Jet Helicopter Services.

A China Southern Airbus A330 was also used to transport the President during a 2019 trip to China.

Sweden 

The Swedish Air Force Transport Squadron Bromma (Stockholm), based on Stockholm-Bromma Airport in Stockholm Municipality, operates the State Flight (Swedish: Statsflyget). It forms part of the Transport and Special Flying Unit (TSFE, Swedish: Transport och Specialflygenheten), which in its turn is a part of the Skaraborg Wing (F 7). Currently it operates two Gulfstream IV aircraft and one Gulfstream G550 in the VIP transport role.

The Air Force also operates three Saab 340 in the VIP transport role.

The use of the State Flight is regulated in the State Flight Ordinance issued by the Government of Sweden. All aircraft serve the official transport needs of the King and other members of the Swedish Royal Family, the Prime Minister and cabinet ministers, and senior Swedish Armed Forces officers.

They also fly scheduled flights, then using business class and using VIP area for check in and security check.

Switzerland 

The Lufttransportdienst des Bundes (LTDB) (English: Swiss Federal Government's air transport service), a unit of the Swiss Air Force located at Bern Airport, operates a fleet of VIP transport aircraft:

 one Dassault Falcon 900EX EASy II (T-785)
 one Cessna 560XL Citation Excel| (T-784)
 one Pilatus PC-24 (T-786)
 two Bombardier Challenger 604 (T-751, T-752), for transport and medical evacuation
 one Beechcraft 1900D (T-729), non VIP transport, located at the Dübendorf Air Base
 one Beechcraft Model 350C Super King Air (T-721), non VIP transport, located at the Dübendorf Air Base

These aircraft are mainly used by members of the Swiss Federal Council. Travel arrangements are coordinated by the Government Travel Centre in the Federal Department of Foreign Affairs. The Swiss-built PC-24 of Pilatus Aircraft complete the fleet in 2019. The Beechcraft 1900D will be replaced in 2019 by two Canadair CL-604 previously operated by Rega. All of these aircraft are based at Bern Airport.

The 6th Air Transport Squadron, flying from the Alpnach Air Base, also operates two Eurocopter EC635 as VIP transport helicopters and has a number of Super Puma helicopters at its disposal, one of which is configured constantly as a VIP transport for domestic use and another one can be configured for VIP transport. Before the introduction of the EC635s, a Eurocopter Dauphin was used as a VIP helicopter.

Syria 

The government of Syria operated a Dassault Falcon 900 in 2016.

Tajikistan
The government uses a Somon Air Boeing 737 for government use.

Tanzania

The Tanzania Government Flight Agency operates a Gulfstream G550 (5H-ONE) and a Fokker F28-3000 (5H-CCM).

Thailand
The Royal Thai Air Force's 602 Royal Guard Squadron operates a Boeing 737-800 for the Royal family flight.

Although available upon their request, members of the royal family usually fly on commercial flights operated by the national carrier, Thai Airways International, when traveling outside of the kingdom.

The Thai government operates one Airbus A340-500, one Airbus A319CJ, and two Embraer ERJ-135LR's as government transports. The A340-500, A320CJ and the A319CJ are maintained by Thai Airways International, the Embraer ERJ-135LRs are maintained by Royal Thai Army.

Timor-Leste
The government uses commercial aircraft for travel.

Togo
The government has used a Burkina Faso-registered Dassault Falcon 7X. They have also used various other planes, such as a private Airbus A318.

Tonga
The government uses private or commercial aircraft.

Trinidad and Tobago
The government uses private or commercial aircraft for travel.

Tunisia

The government of Tunisia operates a Boeing 737 BBJ bought in 1999 and registered under TS-IOO; in 2008 former President Ben Ali tried to replace it with an Airbus A340-542 registered TS-KRT, but he only used it once before he sent it back to France to change the interior design. Ben Ali was ousted in the Tunisian Revolution in 2011; the post-revolutionary government sought to get rid of the aircraft, and it was eventually sold to the Turkish government in 2016.

Turkey

The government of Turkey has a VIP fleet which is maintained by Turkish Airlines for and on behalf of the President of the Republic. Airplanes and helicopters use the state aircraft hangar at Ankara Esenboğa Airport as its main base, which was opened in 2013. The maintenance and parking operations of these aircraft and helicopters are performed here. The airplanes and helicopters are used for the domestic and international flights of the President, Vice Presidents, the Speaker of the Grand National Assembly and the Ministers. In 2016, there was a total of 2026 flight hours performed by 11 aircraft. In the same year, the three helicopters flew together for a total of 485 hours. Flight operations and catering services of the aircraft is done by the Turkish Airlines staff, while the maintenance of aircraft is done by Turkish Technic staff. The maintenance and flight operations of the helicopters are carried out by Presidential personnel.

The composition of the Turkish government fleet is shown in the table below.

The Airbus A340-500 was purchased from the Tunisian government after President Ben Ali, who ordered it to replace a Boeing BBJ, was ousted.

A heavily modified Boeing 747-8 was gifted to Turkey by the royal family of Qatar.

When the President of the Turkish Republic is on board any aircraft, the call-sign is "Turkish Republic One".

Turkmenistan
To transport the President and top officials of the state, Turkmenistan Airlines uses one Boeing 777-200LR of a special configuration (reg: EZ-A777), two Boeing 737-700 (reg: EZ-A007 and EZ-A700), one Bombardier CRJ700 Challenger 870 (reg: EZ-B024) and two Bombardier Challenger 605 (reg: EZ-B022 and EZ-B023).

Tuvalu
The government uses commercial aircraft for travel.

Uganda

The Gulfstream Aerospace G550 (reg: 5X-UGF) is used to transport the President and government officials.
The Ugandan president uses a Mil Mi-171 of the Uganda People's Defence Force for internal flights. The helicopter was delivered in early 2016 after the government had budgeted 11.3 billion Ugandan Shillings for the new helicopter. It is equipped with a cloak room, snackbar, bathroom and luggage compartment and seats up to 12 passengers.

Ukraine

The President of Ukraine, along with high-ranking Ukrainian government officials are allotted two aircraft: an Airbus A319-100 (registered UR-ABA) and an Antonov An-148 (registered UR-UKR), both of which were originally operated by Ukraine Air Enterprise, under the state-owned State Management of Affairs. The An-148, along with an Mi-8MTV-1, was transferred to Ukrainian Ministry of Defence in 2021.

Following the outbreak of the 2022 Russia-Ukraine military hostilities, Volodymyr Zelenskyy, the president of Ukraine, preferred to use an assortment of different transport aircraft operated by the air forces of other nations for international visits, on account of safety concerns. Between 2022 and 2023, Zelenskyy traveled abroad on four different VIP aircraft: the first by a United States Air Force (USAF) Boeing C-40B Clipper for his 2022 visit to the United States, the second by a Royal Air Force (RAF) Boeing C-17 for his 2023 visit to the United Kingdom, the third by an RAF Airbus A321 on a trip directly from the United Kingdom to France, and finally, by a Dassault Falcon 7X on a connecting trip from France to Belgium and to return to Poland.

United Arab Emirates

The United Arab Emirates has seven constituent Emirates, each one with its own private jet fleet. The most notable fleets are maintained by the Dubai Royal Air Wing and Presidential Flight (UAE).

The Dubai Royal Air Wing has 10 aircraft ranging in size from Boeing 737-700 to Boeing 747-400, used by the Emir of Dubai as well as government officials.

Presidential Flight of the Abu Dhabi Emirate has 8 aircraft, the smallest being an Airbus A320-200 and the largest being a Boeing 787-9.

The Sharjah Royal Flight uses an Airbus A319 and Airbus A320.

The Fujairah Amiri flight has one aircraft, an Airbus A320.

United Kingdom

The British Government and Royal Family have use of an Airbus A330 Voyager, two Dassault 900LX and an Airbus A321 neoLR for official travel. The King's Helicopter Flight also provides two Sikorsky S-76+.

The A330 is the single VIP variant of the A330 MRTT operated by the Royal Air Force and AirTanker for air refueling and military transport. The Voyager was reconfigured to include a secure satellite communications system, missile detection, conference facilities, 58 business class seats and 100 economy seats but retains its primary role for the Royal Air Force. No. 32 (The Royal) Squadron of the RAF maintains an Agusta A109SP helicopter for use principally by the British Armed Forces. Until March 2022, the squadron operated four BAe 146s, which have been replaced by two Dassault 900LX aircraft. The A321 is owned and operated by Titan Airways on behalf of the UK Government.

On visits to Commonwealth realms - such as Australia, Canada and New Zealand - the Royal Family have often used the VIP aircraft of the host nation.

The British government used RAF Transport Command Vickers VC-10 aircraft until the late 1990s before their retirement from long-haul flight. During the 2000s and early 2010s they travelled on aircraft borrowed from British Airways or Virgin Atlantic for non-European or long-haul flights, and on rented private jets for inter-European flights. In 2012, then-Prime Minister David Cameron used a Boeing 747-400 operated by charter airline Atlas Air on his four-day state visit to South-east Asia. Atlas Air typically uses this plane for SonAir, the air transport division of Sonangol Group, an Angolan state-owned oil company. On 8 July 2016, the newly converted RAF Voyager was first used by the UK to transport government ministers from London Heathrow airport to the 2016 NATO conference in Warsaw, Poland. In 2020, Prime Minister Boris Johnson's government commissioned additional changes to the aircraft, including a new livery consisting of a mainly white colour scheme, the Union Jack at the rear of the aircraft, and “United Kingdom” written in gold across the sides, to replace the former military grey colour scheme. The changes cost the British Government £900,000 and were carried out at Cambridge Airport. An Airbus A321-200neo with an identical livery was also commissioned in late 2020, with the ability for fast summoning and the capability of flying from London to Washington.

United States

Air travel arrangements for the President are made by the White House Military Office, and may use one of three different types of aircraft depending on the flight and available runways. The first type is two customized Boeing 747-200B jetliners with military designation VC-25A. With a livery first designed by Raymond Loewy in 1962, they are among the most recognizable aircraft in the world and are a global symbol of the country as well as the President of the United States. They are also considered to have inspired other nations to acquire dedicated aircraft for state travel. These aircraft are primarily used by the President and are scheduled to be replaced by Boeing 747-8i aircraft, military designation VC-25B, in the near future. For long-distance domestic travel and all international travel, the United States Armed Forces requires that the presidential aircraft have at least four engines.

The Vice President of the United States, the First Lady and Second Ladies/Gentlemen, the Secretary of State and other high-ranking officials may use customized Boeing 757-200, Boeing 737 or Gulfstream G550 aircraft with military designations C-32A, C-40B and C-37A/B, respectively. The President-elect and Vice President-elect of the United States may also use these aircraft, upon courtesy extended by the departing Administration. Each of these aircraft bear liveries based on the Loewy design. However, the President only uses either VC-25A or C-32 aircraft – though, exceptionally, President Barack Obama once used a C-37A for private travel to New York City in 2009 – while the Vice President almost always uses C-32 aircraft. For long-distance domestic travel and international trips, the Secretary of Defense uses one of four modified Boeing 747-200B aircraft with the military designation of E-4B. These aircraft are specially fitted to serve as National Emergency Airborne Command Posts during wartime.

The callsign of any aircraft is regular if it is not currently carrying the President or vice-president. The callsign of any military aircraft that currently carries the President is called that military branch name followed by "One", such as Army One, Air Force One, Navy One, or Marine One (which is typically associated with a helicopter). The callsign of any military aircraft that currently carries the Vice President is called that military branch name followed by "Two", such as Air Force Two, Coast Guard Two, or Marine Two (which is typically associated with a helicopter). In the one instance that the President traveled on a private aircraft its callsign was Executive One, and Vice President Rockefeller's private Gulfstream was Executive Two when he was on board during his term of office.

In addition, the US military maintains separate fleets of Boeing C-40 Clippers (Boeing 737-700), C-37As (Gulfstream V) and C-37Bs (Gulfstream G550) for use by government officials, Members of Congress and the White House. These may have different liveries than the Loewy design.

Uruguay

The President of Uruguay uses an Embraer EMB 120 Brasilia, operated by the Uruguayan Air Force, for flights within South America.

Uzbekistan

As of December 2020, the Uzbek government use two Airbus A320-200, one Boeing 767-300, and one Boeing 787-8 for VIP transport.

It previously also operated a Boeing 757 with the tail number 7O-VIP, which was sold to the Yemeni Government.

Vatican City

Typically, the Pope flies on a chartered ITA Airways fixed-wing aircraft when travelling to or from more distant destinations. Prior to 2021, the Pope formerly flew on a chartered Alitalia flight before the airline ceased operations in 2021 and later reorganized into ITA Airways. Traditional protocol dictates that a Pope flies to a country he is visiting on a chartered ITA Airways jet and to return on a jet belonging to a flag carrier from the visited nation; this may vary when he is touring multiple nations. When Pope John Paul II visited South America in May 1988, he travelled to Paraguay from Peru in an AeroPerú DC-8, but left Asunción International Airport back to Europe in a transcontinental Alitalia Boeing 747, which was brought in just hours before his farewell ceremony. Líneas Aéreas Paraguayas' longest-range aircraft at the time were Boeing 707-320Bs, which had to stop in Dakar, Senegal to refuel. However, he politely travelled within the country in a LAP jet, which incidentally carried the distinguished visitor's coat of arms in the forward fuselage as courtesy. Pope Benedict XVI also returned to Rome from Brazil on Alitalia.

The call sign of a papal flight within Italy is "volo papale" ("papal flight" in Italian) followed by the number of flights the pope has made. Pope John Paul II made 104 papal flights, so his call sign would have been "Volo Papale 104". The pope also uses a helicopter of the Italian Air Force (Aeronautica Militare), an AgustaWestland AW139, for short distances. There are two papal heliports, with the Vatican City Heliport being on the tiny state's western corner, and another on the southern edge of the extraterritorial papal residence of Castel Gandolfo. The former bears the official Latin designation Portus Helicopterorum.

It is erroneously, but widely, believed and reported that international flights carrying the Pope use the callsign "Shepherd One". This is an urban myth.

Vanuatu
The government can use turbo-prop or commercial aircraft for international travel.

Venezuela
Two government aircraft in 2019 were transferred to the management of the national airline Conviasa, repainted in its colors and re-registered. Airbus A319CJ (ex-reg: 0001) - YV2984, Boeing 737-200 (ex-reg: 0207) - YV3434. An Embraer Lineage 1000 (reg:YV3016) from Conviasa is used too.

Former President Hugo Chavez often traveled on board an Ilyushin Il-96 aircraft owned by Cubana de Aviacion. A fleet of about 15 Dassault Falcons 900EXes, Falcon 50s and Learjets 45s is used for high-ranking officials.

Vietnam

Vietnam has no dedicated airframe that is configured and used exclusively for VIP transport. Instead, the state uses general-purpose aircraft owned and commissioned by state-owned operators and armed forces' units for such special missions.

A Boeing 787-9 (registered VN-A868) or sometimes an Airbus A350-900 (registered VN-A896 or VN-A898) chartered from Vietnam Airlines is often used for international and long haul flights. For domestic and short haul flights, an Airbus A321 is chartered from Vietnam Airlines. The callsign Viet Nam One (VN1/HVN1) is often used when the flight is chartered by the government, especially to transport key people of the Vietnamese state. None of those Vietnam Airlines airframes are reportedly configured specifically for VIP transport missions, instead, they are all operating commercial services on daily basis and state members use the "casual" business class on special flights.

Helicopters of the Vietnam Helicopter Corporation and/or the Vietnam People's Air Force and/or the Vietnam People's Navy can also be used for VIP transport missions.

Yemen

Yemenia operated a VIP-configured Boeing 747SP registered 7O-YMN for use by the government of Yemen. The aircraft carried the Yemenia Yemen Airways livery. In March 2015, the Boeing 747SP was damaged by gun fire during a militia attack at Aden airport, and a subsequent blaze destroyed the aircraft completely. In August 2016, the internationally recognized government bought a Boeing 757-200 registered 7O-VIP that previously operated as a VIP transport for Uzbekistan Airways with UK75700 as its registration. The 757 underwent refit and repaint in Yemen government's livery at GMF AeroAsia's maintenance facility at Soekarno-Hatta International Airport, Jakarta, prior to delivery to Yemen.

Yugoslavia (former)
Former Yugoslav president Josip Broz Tito used many aircraft during his term as president. The most notable aircraft types in service were the Douglas DC-6, Ilyushin Il-18, Sud Aviation Caravelle and Boeing 727.

Zambia

The first Zambian president, Kenneth Kaunda, used a Douglas DC-8 of the now liquidated Zambia Airways among other national carriers. His departure from office saw the new president, Frederick Chiluba acquire a more modern look for government and thus the Challenger CL604 (reg:9J-ONE) was acquired.

In 2019, a Sukhoi Superjet 100 in a business jet configuration was ordered but was later cancelled.

Also, at the end of 2018, the Zambian Air Force bought Gulfstream G650 (AF001) for the president. This deal caused a great resonance and scandal within the country.

Zimbabwe

The President of Zimbabwe travels in a chartered Air Zimbabwe Boeing 767-200ER aircraft, which is part of the national airline's fleet. Occasionally, the president will share the aircraft with commercial passengers on scheduled flights. The president's own British Aerospace 146–200 Series aircraft ordered in the 1980s by the Zimbabwe Government's Ministry of Defence as a VIP aircraft for the President's use was leased to the national airline upon delivery after Air Zimbabwe's need for an aircraft that could land on the country's short local runways had become dire. The aircraft was leased to the airline under an arrangement that provided for Air Zimbabwe to maintain it and fly it as required, and the President to have the use of it when needed. After the British Aerospace 146–200 was retired, the national airline continued its role as a state VIP transporter, using the 767-200ER.

See also 

 Official state car
 State visit
 Royal train
 Royal yacht

References

Citations

Sources 

 Books
 
 
 Von Hardesty. Air Force One: The Aircraft that Shaped the Modern Presidency. Creative Publishing international; illustrated edition (1 September 2005). .

External links 

 Los aviones presidenciales más caros del mundo Clarín.com, 2016-07-05  (accessed 2019-02-17)

 
Aviation-related lists